Carol King may refer to:
 Carole King (born 1942), American singer, songwriter and pianist
 Carol Weiss King (1895–1952), progressive American human rights lawyer
 Carol King (1942–1958), one of the murder victims of Charles Starkweather
 Carol King (actress) (born 1963), Nigerian actress and presenter
 Carol Vorderman (born 1960), British media personality, during her 10-year marriage with Patrick King (1990–2000)

See also
 Carolyn King (disambiguation)